Black Giant is a  mountain summit located west of the crest of the Sierra Nevada mountain range, in Fresno County of central California, United States. Black Giant ranks as the 86th highest summit in California. It is the northernmost and highest summit on its namesake ridge, the Black Divide in northern Kings Canyon National Park.

History

This mountain was bestowed its descriptive name in 1904 by Joseph Nisbet LeConte, a Sierra Nevada explorer and cartographer. LeConte wrote: "A few miles to the south rose a particularly inviting point, which certainly commands a peerless view. But time forbade an ascent this year, so I named it the Black Giant, and wondered how long it would stand as it has so far stood, an untrodden summit."

The first ascent of the summit was made in 1905 by George R. Davis, USGS topographic engineer.

In creating the map of the Mount Goddard quadrangle, 1907–1909, the USGS named this peak "Mount Goode", apparently unaware of LeConte's earlier naming. The Black Giant name was restored and officially adopted in 1926 by the United States Board on Geographic Names, and the Goode name was transferred to the present location of Mount Goode, five miles to the east-northeast of Black Giant.

Climbing
Established climbing routes:

 West Slope  –  – First Ascent 1905 
 South Slope – class 2 
 Southeast Ridge  – class 3 – FA 1971
 Northeast Face – class 4 – FA 1966 by Steve Roper

Climate
According to the Köppen climate classification system, Black Giant is located in an alpine climate zone. Most weather fronts originate in the Pacific Ocean, and travel east toward the Sierra Nevada mountains. As fronts approach, they are forced upward by the peaks, causing them to drop their moisture in the form of rain or snowfall onto the range (orographic lift). This climate supports four small glaciers on the northeast aspect. Precipitation runoff from this mountain drains into tributaries of the Middle Fork Kings River.

Gallery

See also

 List of the major 4000-meter summits of California

References

External links

 Weather forecast: Black Giant
 Black Giant photo by Ansel Adams 
 Black Giant photo: Flickr

Mountains of Fresno County, California
Mountains of Kings Canyon National Park
North American 4000 m summits
Mountains of Northern California
Sierra Nevada (United States)